Brivido Giallo is an Italian horror cable series that featured four full-length movies directed by Lamberto Bava. The films included in airing order are Graveyard Disturbance, Until Death, The Ogre, and Dinner with a Vampire.

Production
In the late 1980s Italian film productions began to flounder, so director Lamberto Bava decided to make a jump to television. He struck a deal with executive producers Gianfranco Transunto and Gianlorenzo Battaglia to make a cable television series that would consist of four full-length films. The plan was to have each film have a different tone: Graveyard Disturbance and Dinner with a Vampire having a comical approach and Until Death and The Ogre having a more serious approach. All four films would be co-written by legendary Italian writer Dardano Sacchetti with music composed by Simon Boswell.

Home video release
The series have never been released together, but each film has been released around the world separately, sometimes released under different titles.

In the United States The Ogre was the first film in the series to be released on DVD in 2003 through Media-Blasters subsidiary Shriek Show (which retitled the film Demons III: The Ogre on the DVD artwork). MYA Communication would later release the other three films on DVD in 2009.

References

External links

1980s Italian television series
1986 Italian television series debuts
1986 Italian television series endings
Horror fiction television series
Italian television series